Francesco Signorelli (c.1495–1553) was a 16th-century Italian Renaissance painter.

He was nephew and artistic heir to his uncle Luca Signorelli. Not much is known about Signorelli's life except through his works. He was born, and lived and worked his whole life in and around Cortona. He primarily painted religious-themed paintings for church commissions. One work executed by Francesco Signorelli Madonna and Child is part of the National Museums Liverpool collection.

References

External links
 Web Gallery of Art

1480s births
1550s deaths
15th-century Italian painters
Italian male painters
16th-century Italian painters
Italian Renaissance painters
People from Cortona